Thierry Metz (1956–1997) was a French poet.

Life 
At the age of 21, Metz moved with his family to Saint-Romain-le-Noble. There he worked as a yard labourer, a mason, and then a farm worker. During intervening periods of unemployment he wrote.

1956 births
1997 deaths
Writers from Paris
20th-century French poets
French male poets
20th-century French male writers